Minor Swing is an album by organist John Patton which features John Zorn and was originally released on the DIW label in Japan in 1995. The album was considered part of Patton's 1990 "comeback".

Reception
The Allmusic review by Al Campbell awarded the album 3½ stars noting that "Luckily, on Minor Swing, organist Big John Patton and John Zorn encourage taking chances and opening the music up, while not going so far out as to overwhelm the intended fundamental groove... highly recommended".

Track listing 
All compositions by John Patton except as indicated.
 "The Way I Feel" - 12:05
 "Tyrone" - 6:32   
 "Minor Swing" - 8:36   
 "The Rock" - 6:27   
 "Along Came John" - 5:14   
 "Lite Hit" (Marvin Cabell, John Patton) - 7:14   
 "B Men Thel" - 7:27

Personnel 
 John Patton – organ
 John Zorn – alto saxophone
 Ed Cherry – guitar
 Kenny Wollesen – drums

References

1995 albums
DIW Records albums
John Patton (musician) albums
Albums produced by John Zorn